Aura Power Station (Aura kraftverk) is a hydroelectric power station located in the municipality Sunndal in Møre og Romsdal, Norway.

See also

References 

Hydroelectric power stations in Norway
Buildings and structures in Møre og Romsdal
Dams in Norway